Antonio James may refer to:

Antonio D. James (born 1985), film director
Antonio G. James (c. 1954–1996), American murderer, see Execution of Antonio James

See also

Tony James (disambiguation)
Anthony James (disambiguation)